The 2002–03 daytime network television schedule for the six major English-language commercial broadcast networks in the United States in operation during that television season covers the weekday daytime hours from September 2002 to August 2003. The schedule is followed by a list per network of returning series, new series, and series canceled after the 2001–02 season.

Affiliates fill time periods not occupied by network programs with local or syndicated programming. PBS – which offers daytime programming through a children's program block, PBS Kids – is not included, as its member television stations have local flexibility over most of their schedules and broadcast times for network shows may vary. Also not included are stations affiliated with Pax TV, as its schedule is composed mainly of syndicated reruns although it also carried some first-run programs.

Legend

 New series are highlighted in bold.

Schedule
 All times correspond to U.S. Eastern and Pacific Time scheduling (except for some live sports or events). Except where affiliates slot certain programs outside their network-dictated timeslots, subtract one hour for Central, Mountain, Alaska, and Hawaii-Aleutian times.
 Local schedules may differ, as affiliates have the option to pre-empt or delay network programs. Such scheduling may be limited to preemptions caused by local or national breaking news or weather coverage (which may force stations to tape delay certain programs in overnight timeslots or defer them to a co-operated or other contracted station in their regular timeslot) and any major sports events scheduled to air in a weekday timeslot (mainly during major holidays). Stations may air shows at other times at their preference.

Monday-Friday

ABC note: Port Charles aired its final episode on October 3, 2003. ABC returned the 12:30 pm timeslot to its affiliates on October 6. Some affiliates did not air the program at its intended timeslot during its last three months on the air.

Saturday
{| class=wikitable style="font-size:90%"
! width="1.5%" bgcolor="#C0C0C0" colspan="2"|Network
! width="4%" bgcolor="#C0C0C0"|7:00 am
! width="4%" bgcolor="#C0C0C0"|7:30 am
! width="4%" bgcolor="#C0C0C0"|8:00 am
! width="4%" bgcolor="#C0C0C0"|8:30 am
! width="4%" bgcolor="#C0C0C0"|9:00 am
! width="4%" bgcolor="#C0C0C0"|9:30 am
! width="4%" bgcolor="#C0C0C0"|10:00 am
! width="4%" bgcolor="#C0C0C0"|10:30 am
! width="4%" bgcolor="#C0C0C0"|11:00 am
! width="4%" bgcolor="#C0C0C0"|11:30 am
! width="4%" bgcolor="#C0C0C0"|noon
! width="4%" bgcolor="#C0C0C0"|12:30 pm
! width="4%" bgcolor="#C0C0C0"|1:00 pm
! width="4%" bgcolor="#C0C0C0"|1:30 pm
! width="4%" bgcolor="#C0C0C0"|2:00 pm
! width="4%" bgcolor="#C0C0C0"|2:30 pm
! width="4%" bgcolor="#C0C0C0"|3:00 pm
! width="4%" bgcolor="#C0C0C0"|3:30 pm
! width="4%" bgcolor="#C0C0C0"|4:00 pm
! width="4%" bgcolor="#C0C0C0"|4:30 pm
! width="4%" bgcolor="#C0C0C0"|5:00 pm
! width="4%" bgcolor="#C0C0C0"|5:30 pm
! width="4%" bgcolor="#C0C0C0"|6:00 pm
! width="4%" bgcolor="#C0C0C0"|6:30 pm
|-
! bgcolor="#C0C0C0" rowspan="2"|ABC
! Fall
| bgcolor="white" colspan="2" rowspan="2"|Local and/orsyndicatedprogramming
| bgcolor="bf9fef" rowspan="2"|Teamo Supremo
| bgcolor="bf9fef" rowspan="2"|Recess
| bgcolor="bf9fef" rowspan="2"|Fillmore!
| bgcolor="bf9fef" rowspan="2"|Recess
| bgcolor="bf9fef" rowspan="2"|Lizzie McGuire
| bgcolor="bf9fef" rowspan="2"|The Proud Family
| bgcolor="bf9fef" rowspan="2"|Kim Possible
| colspan="2" rowspan="1" bgcolor="bf9fef" |Power Rangers Wild Force
| bgcolor="bf9fef" rowspan="2"|NBA Inside Stuff
| bgcolor="99ccff" colspan="12" rowspan="1"|College Football on ABC
|-
! Spring
| colspan="2" rowspan="1" bgcolor="bf9fef" |Power Rangers Ninja Storm
| bgcolor="99ccff" colspan="4" rowspan="1"|ABC Sports and/or local programming
| bgcolor="99ccff" colspan="6 rowspan="1"|ABC Sports programming
| bgcolor="gold"|Local news
| bgcolor="gold"|ABC World News Saturday
|-
! bgcolor="#C0C0C0" rowspan="4"|CBS
! Fall
| bgcolor="bf9fef" rowspan="2"|Blue's Clues
| bgcolor="bf9fef" rowspan="2"|Dora the Explorer
| bgcolor="bf9fef" rowspan="2"|Hey Arnold!
| bgcolor="bf9fef" rowspan="2"|The Wild Thornberrys
| bgcolor="gold" colspan="4" rowspan="4"|The Saturday Early Show
| bgcolor="bf9fef" rowspan="1"|As Told by Ginger
| bgcolor="bf9fef" rowspan="1"|Pelswick
| bgcolor="99ccff" rowspan="1" colspan="16"|SEC on CBS
|-
! Winter
| bgcolor="bf9fef" rowspan="1"|Hey Arnold!
| bgcolor="bf9fef" rowspan="1"|As Told by Ginger
| bgcolor="99ccff" rowspan="3"colspan="6"|CBS Sports and/or local programming
| bgcolor="99ccff" rowspan="3"colspan="6"|CBS Sports programming
| bgcolor="gold"rowspan="3"|Local news
| bgcolor="gold"rowspan="3"|CBS Evening News
|-
! February
| bgcolor="bf9fef" rowspan="1"|Rugrats
| bgcolor="bf9fef" rowspan="1"|The Wild Thornberrys
| bgcolor="bf9fef" rowspan="2"|ChalkZone
| bgcolor="bf9fef" rowspan="1"|Hey Arnold!
| bgcolor="bf9fef" rowspan="2"|Dora the Explorer
| bgcolor="bf9fef" rowspan="2"|Blue's Clues
|-
! August
| bgcolor="bf9fef" rowspan="1"|The Wild Thornberrys
| bgcolor="bf9fef" rowspan="1"|Hey Arnold!
| bgcolor="bf9fef" rowspan="1"|Little Bill
|-
! bgcolor="#C0C0C0" rowspan="3"|NBC
! Fall
| bgcolor="white" rowspan="3"colspan="2"|Local and/orsyndicatedprogramming
| bgcolor="gold" rowspan="3"colspan="4"|Today
| bgcolor="bf9fef"rowspan="1"|Prehistoric Planet
| bgcolor="bf9fef"rowspan="3"|Croc Files
| bgcolor="bf9fef"rowspan="1"|Operation Junkyard
| bgcolor="bf9fef"rowspan="2"|Endurance
| bgcolor="bf9fef"rowspan="1"|Scout's Safari
| bgcolor="bf9fef"rowspan="1"|Strange Days at Blake Holsey High
| bgcolor="99ccff" rowspan="3"colspan="4"|NBC Sports and/or local programming
| bgcolor="99ccff" rowspan="3"colspan="6"|NBC Sports programming
| bgcolor="gold"rowspan="3"|Local news
| bgcolor="gold"rowspan="3"|NBC Nightly News
|-
! May
| bgcolor="bf9fef"rowspan="1"|Adventure Camp
| bgcolor="bf9fef"rowspan="2"|Trading Spaces: Boys vs. Girls
| bgcolor="bf9fef"rowspan="1"|Strange Days at Blake Holsey High
| bgcolor="bf9fef"rowspan="1"|Scout's Safari
|-
! July
| bgcolor="bf9fef"rowspan="1"|Croc Files| bgcolor="bf9fef"rowspan="1"|Strange Days at Blake Holsey High
| bgcolor="bf9fef"rowspan="1"|Scout's Safari
| bgcolor="bf9fef"rowspan="1"|Adventure Camp
|-
! bgcolor="#C0C0C0" rowspan="4"|Fox
! Fall
| bgcolor="white" colspan="2" rowspan="4"|Local and/orsyndicatedprogramming
| bgcolor="bf9fef" rowspan="2"|Stargate Infinity| bgcolor="bf9fef" rowspan="1"|Ultraman Tiga| bgcolor="bf9fef" rowspan="2"|Kirby: Right Back at Ya!| bgcolor="bf9fef" rowspan="2"|Ultimate Muscle: The Kinnikuman Legacy| bgcolor="bf9fef" rowspan="1"|Ultraman Tiga| bgcolor="bf9fef" rowspan="1"|Ultimate Muscle: The Kinnikuman Legacy| bgcolor="bf9fef" rowspan="2"|Kirby: Right Back at Ya!| bgcolor="bf9fef" rowspan="1"|Fighting Foodons| bgcolor="bf9fef" rowspan="3"|NFL Under the Helmet| bgcolor="99ccff" rowspan="3"colspan="13"|Fox Sports and/or local programming
|-
! October
| bgcolor="bf9fef" rowspan="1"|Fighting Foodons
| bgcolor="bf9fef" rowspan="3"|Ultimate Muscle: The Kinnikuman Legacy
| bgcolor="bf9fef" rowspan="1"|Fighting Foodons
| bgcolor="bf9fef" rowspan="1"|Ultraman Tiga
|-
! Spring
| bgcolor="bf9fef" rowspan="2"|Fighting Foodons
| bgcolor="bf9fef" rowspan="2"|Back to the Future
| bgcolor="bf9fef" rowspan="1"|Teenage Mutant Ninja Turtles| bgcolor="bf9fef" rowspan="1"|Kirby: Right Back at Ya!
| bgcolor="bf9fef" rowspan="2"|Teenage Mutant Ninja Turtles| bgcolor="bf9fef" rowspan="1"|The Cramp Twins| bgcolor="bf9fef" rowspan="1"|Pirate Islands|-
! Summer
| bgcolor="bf9fef" rowspan="1"|Kirby: Right Back at Ya!
| bgcolor="bf9fef" rowspan="1"|Ultimate Muscle: The Kinnikuman Legacy
| bgcolor="bf9fef" rowspan="1"|Teenage Mutant Ninja Turtles
| bgcolor="bf9fef" rowspan="1"|WMAC Masters| bgcolor="white" rowspan="1"|Local and/orsyndicatedprogramming
| bgcolor="99ccff" rowspan="1"|This Week in Baseball
| bgcolor="99ccff" rowspan="1"colspan="12"|Fox Sports and/or local programming
|-
! bgcolor="#C0C0C0" rowspan="4"|The WB
! Fall
| bgcolor="white" colspan="2" rowspan="4"|Local and/orsyndicated programming
| bgcolor="bf9fef" rowspan="1"|Yu-Gi-Oh!
| bgcolor="bf9fef" rowspan="1"|What's New Scooby-Doo?| bgcolor="bf9fef" rowspan="4"|Jackie Chan Adventures
| bgcolor="bf9fef" rowspan="1"|Ozzy & Drix| bgcolor="bf9fef" rowspan="4"|Pokémon
| bgcolor="bf9fef" rowspan="1"|¡Mucha Lucha!| bgcolor="bf9fef" rowspan="4"|Yu-Gi-Oh!
| bgcolor="bf9fef" rowspan="1"|X-Men: Evolution
| bgcolor="white" colspan="18" rowspan="4"|Local and/orsyndicated programming
|-
! February
| bgcolor="bf9fef" rowspan="2"|What's New Scooby-Doo?
| bgcolor="bf9fef" rowspan="3"|Yu-Gi-Oh!
| bgcolor="bf9fef" rowspan="1"|The Mummy
| bgcolor="bf9fef" rowspan="2"|Static Shock
| bgcolor="bf9fef" rowspan="1"|¡Mucha Lucha!  / Ozzy & Drix  / Cubix
|-
! May
| bgcolor="bf9fef" rowspan="1"|MegaMan: NT Warrior| bgcolor="bf9fef" rowspan="1"|The Mummy
|-
! August
| bgcolor="bf9fef" rowspan="1"|Pokémon
| bgcolor="bf9fef" rowspan="1"|Ozzy & Drix
| bgcolor="bf9fef" rowspan="1"|X-Men: Evolution
| bgcolor="bf9fef" rowspan="1"|Static Shock
|}

Sunday

By network
ABCReturning series:ABC World News Tonight with Peter Jennings
All My Children
General Hospital
Good Morning America
Lizzie McGuire
One Life to Live
Port Charles
Recess
Teamo Supremo
This Week with George Stephanopoulos
The ViewNew series:Fillmore!Kim PossibleNBA Inside Stuff (moved from TNBC)Power Rangers Ninja StormPower Rangers Wild Force (moved from Fox Kids)The Proud FamilyNot returning from 2001–02:House of Mouse
Even Stevens
Lloyd in Space
Mary-Kate and Ashley in Action!
Sabrina: The Animated Series
The New Adventures of Winnie the Pooh (reruns)
Teacher's Pet
The Weekenders

CBSReturning series:As the World Turns
Blue's Clues
The Bold and the Beautiful
Dora the Explorer
The Early Show
CBS Evening News with Dan Rather
CBS News Sunday Morning with Charles Osgood
Face the Nation
Guiding Light
Little Bill
The Price is Right
The Saturday Early Show
The Young and the RestlessNew series:As Told by GingerChalkZoneHey Arnold!PelswickRugratsThe Wild ThornberrysNot returning from 2001–02:Bob the Builder
Franklin
Oswald

NBCReturning series:Days of Our Lives
Meet the Press
NBC Nightly News with Tom Brokaw
Passions
TodayNew series:Adventure CampCroc FilesEnduranceOperation JunkyardPrehistoric PlanetScout's SafariStrange Days at Blake Holsey HighTrading Spaces: Boys vs. GirlsNot returning from 2001–02:All About Us
City Guys
NBA Inside Stuff (moved to ABC Kids)
Just Deal
Sk8

FoxReturning series:Fox News Sunday
This Week in BaseballNew series:Back to the FutureThe Cramp TwinsFighting FoodonsKirby: Right Back at Ya!NFL Under the HelmetPirate IslandsStargate InfinityTeenage Mutant Ninja TurtlesUltimate Muscle: The Kinnikuman LegacyUltraman TigaWMAC MastersNot returning from 2001–02:Action Man
Alienators: Evolution Continues
Digimon: Digital Monsters (moved to UPN)
Galidor: Defenders of the Outer Dimension
Life with Louie (reruns)
The Magic School Bus (reruns)
Medabots
Mon Colle Knights
Moolah Beach
The New Woody Woodpecker Show
Power Rangers Time Force
Power Rangers Wild Force (moved to ABC Kids)
The Ripping Friends
Transformers: Robots in Disguise

UPNReturning series:Buzz Lightyear of Star Command
The Legend of Tarzan
RecessNew series:Digimon: Digital Monsters Not returning from 2001–02:Sabrina: The Animated Series
The Weekenders

The WBReturning series:Cubix: Robots for Everyone
Jackie Chan Adventures
The Mummy
Pokémon: Master Quest
Rescue Heroes: Global Response Team
Scooby-Doo
Static Shock
X-Men: Evolution
Yu-Gi-Oh!New series:MegaMan: NT Warrior¡Mucha Lucha!Ozzy & DrixWhat's New Scooby-Doo?Not returning from 2001–02:'Batman BeyondCardcaptorsThe Nightmare RoomPhantom InvestigatorsThe Powerpuff GirlsSailor MoonThe Zeta Project''

See also
2002–03 United States network television schedule (prime-time)
2002–03 United States network television schedule (late night)

United States weekday network television schedules
2002 in American television
2003 in American television